Toby Sexton (born 1 March 2001) is an Australian professional rugby league footballer who plays as a  for the Gold Coast Titans in the NRL.

Background
Sexton was born in Sunnybank, a suburb of Brisbane, Queensland.

Playing career
In round 19 of the 2021 NRL season, Sexton made his debut for the Gold Coast against the St. George Illawarra Dragons, scoring a try and kicking six goals during a 32–10 victory.
Sexton played a total of 19 games for the Gold Coast in the 2022 NRL season as the club finished 13th on the table.

References

External links
Gold Coast Titans profile

2001 births
Australian rugby league players
Rugby league halfbacks
Gold Coast Titans players
Living people
Rugby league players from Brisbane